The 2020–present global chip shortage is an ongoing global crisis in which the demand for integrated circuits (commonly known as "semiconductor chips") exceeds the supply, affecting more than 169 industries. The crisis has led to major price increases, shortages queues and reselling among consumers and manufacturers for automobiles, graphics cards, video game consoles, computers, household appliances, and other electronic products that require semiconductors.

From early 2020, when the effects of and the mitigation of the COVID-19 pandemic caused disruptions in supply chains and logistics which, coupled with a 13% increase in global demand for PCs owing to some countries' shift to a stay-at-home economy, impacted the availability of key chips necessary for the manufacturing of a broad swathe of electronics. The pandemic's impact on the manufacture of semiconductors in South Korea and Taiwan was cited as a cause for the shortage, with constrained supply impacting industries as broad as console gaming and the automotive industry.

In February 2021, market analysts IHS Markit were cited by the BBC as forecasting the impact of the dearth to last through to the third quarter of 2021; lead times on chip supply at this time had already extended to 15 weeks, the longest lead time since 2017. By April 2021, lead times for semiconductors from Broadcom Inc. had "extended to 22.2 weeks, up from 12.2 weeks in February 2020".

Severe weather events including the droughts in Taiwan during the summer of 2021 were also a significant contributing factor. The droughts affected the production due to the lack of available ultrapure water that is needed to clean the factories and wafers.

At the end of Q1 2021, used car prices in some countries were increasing due to the demand from both economic recovery, as well as the chip shortage. The price of some cars increased as much as 10% in Q1.

Causes
The global chip crisis is due to a combination of different events described as a perfect storm with the snowball effect of the COVID-19 pandemic being the primary reason for accelerating shortages. Another contributing factor is that demand is so great that existing production capacity is unable to keep up. Other causes have been attributed to the China–United States trade war and the 2021 drought in Taiwan.

COVID-19 pandemic

An increase in remote work and remote learning caused a surge in demand for computers, network peripherals, and other consumer electronics with chips. Due to lockdowns, chip production facilities were shut down, leading to the depletion of inventories. In the fourth quarter of 2020, traditional computer sales saw a 26.1% growth over the previous year.

China–United States trade war

In September 2020, as part of the economic conflict between China and the United States, the US Department of Commerce imposed restrictions on China's largest chip manufacturer, Semiconductor Manufacturing International Corporation (SMIC), which made it harder for them to sell to companies with American ties. These restrictions forced companies to use other manufacturing plants like Taiwan Semiconductor Manufacturing Company Limited (TSMC) and Samsung. However, these companies were already producing at maximum capacity.

In 2020, GlobalFoundries, a U.S.-based chipmaker and AMD's semiconductor manufacturing arm before its IPO, ceased operations at its only Chinese plant. The fab was supposed to produce 300 mm wafers, but the 65,000-square-meter factory in Beijing never began production.

In October 2022, the United States announced they would introduce further measures in restricting sales of computer chip technology to Chinese companies, primarily affecting sales of advanced chips necessary for cutting-edge technologies. As a result, the shares of major Asian chipmaker companies have slumped during the reopening of stock markets in Taiwan, Japan, and South Korea after public holidays.

Cryptocurrency
The increased use of proof-of-work cryptocurrencies has led to a large amount of mining, which is done primarily with general-purpose graphics processing units (GPGPUs). The high demand for GPUs for cryptocurrency mining has reduced their availability for other uses.

Severe weather
A severe winter storm in February 2021 forced the closure of three plants in Austin, Texas owned by Samsung, Infineon, and NXP Semiconductors, due to loss of electricity. This set back supply from these plants by several months.

Taiwan is the leader of the global semiconductor industry, with TSMC alone accounting for more than 50% of the global wafer foundry market in 2020. In 2021, Taiwan experienced its worst drought in more than half a century, leading to problems among chip manufacturers that use large amounts of ultra-pure water to clean their factories and wafers. For example, TSMC's facilities used more than 63,000 tons of water a day, more than 10% of the supply of two local reservoirs.

Fires at facilities
An Asahi Kasei semiconductor plant which specializes in ADC and DAC components caught fire in October 2020. Another Japanese factory owned by Renesas Electronics, which supplies 30% of the global market for microcontroller units used in cars, caught fire in March 2021; Renesas said it would take at least 100 days for them to get back to normal production. In January 2022, a fire from the Berlin plant of ASML affected the production of EUV lithography equipment used in chip production.

Russia–Ukraine war

The price of neon, a noble gas needed for lasers in chip manufacture, increased sixfold between December 2021 and March 2022 due to the COVID-19 pandemic and war in Ukraine. The supply of neon was severely constrained by the 2022 Russian invasion of Ukraine, sparking fears that the conflict could worsen the chip shortage. Ukraine produces about half of the global neon supply as a byproduct of the Russian steel industry, and 90% of the semiconductor-grade neon used in the United States. Semiconductor manufacturers have searched for alternative suppliers, such as noble-gas manufacturers in China, but any new supplier would take at least nine months to increase production. The supply of krypton and xenon, of which Ukraine is also a major exporter, was affected as well.

Russia exports about 40% of the global supply of the metal palladium, used in certain chip components, and the supply of palladium could be affected by trade sanctions imposed by Western governments.

Impacted industries
According to an analysis by Goldman Sachs, at least 169 industries have been impacted by the global chip shortage, with the automotive and consumer electronics industries among the most affected by the crisis.

Cars

The average modern car can have between 1,400 and 1,500 chips, some even up to 3,000. Cars account for 15% of global chip consumption, while personal electronics account for around 50%. Chip revenues are even more skewed towards non-automotive sectors. The chip shortage is expected to cost the global automotive industry US$210 billion in revenue in 2021. Despite lower sales, some manufacturers increased profits over 2020, as Toyota and General Motors, for example, saw record profits for 2021, due to resilient demand and decreased financial incentives offered to buyers.

At the start of the pandemic, car manufacturers incorrectly predicted that sales would drop, canceled chip orders, and were unprepared to meet demand. Chip manufacturers had more commitments from the IT sector, which reduced capacity for car chips. Ford parked thousands of unfinished vehicles at Kentucky Speedway as the company waited for chips to finish assembling those cars. Toyota planned to cut vehicle production worldwide by 40% in September 2021, while General Motors announced it would halt production of almost all cars at its North American plants for a week or two that same month. During the third quarter of 2021, there were only two-thirds as many new car sales in the United States as there had been during the same time period in 2020, as supply could not meet demand. Opel closed its Eisenach manufacturing plant until 2022 because of the shortage, causing 1,300 workers to be temporarily laid off. In mid-2022 Automotive manufacturing corporation Stellantis paused production at two plants in France claiming a lack of semiconductors.

Desktop computers and graphics cards 
The availability of virtually all components required to build a desktop computer has been greatly impacted by the global chip shortage. The two main manufacturers of CPU chips, AMD and Intel, have struggled to keep up with the rising demand of their products as a result of the global pandemic. Furthermore, the global chip shortage has made it difficult to acquire graphics cards, with the unavailability of new and used GPU cards being primarily caused by an increase in criminal cryptocurrency mining in 2021. Furthermore, AMD and Nvidia, the leading manufacturers of GPU cards, both released new models of their flagship cards during the pandemic; these newer models have been in extremely high demand, and rarely found in stock. Furthermore, greedy scalpers often utilize Internet bots to automatically buy out a retailer's stock in a matter of seconds. These cards are then resold with the price marked up to 300% above the MSRP.

However, pricing for GPU has begun to go back to MSRP due to Ether (one of the most used cryptocurrencies, second to Bitcoin by market capitalization) undergoing consensus mechanism change dubbed "The Merge", which changes it from being from energy guzzling proof-of-work (PoW) to proof-of-stake (PoS) around 15 September 2022. This, combined with the release of 40-series Nvidia GPUs, alongside decreasing cryptomining profitability as the coin prices plummeted, resulted in cryptominers offloading their used cards to the market.

Video game consoles
During the COVID-19 pandemic, cinemas and theaters were closed to prevent the spread of the virus, leading many people to turn to home entertainment during periods of self-isolation, which increased the demand for video game consoles. With the release of the ninth generation of video game consoles coinciding with the pandemic, demand increased even further, with both Microsoft and Sony reporting record demand for their new consoles. Microsoft expected in February 2021 that shortages of the Xbox Series X and Series S would continue until at least mid-2021, while Sony warned in May 2021 that short supply of the PlayStation 5 console would continue into 2022. Both companies use AMD chips manufactured by TSMC in their ninth-generation consoles, which puts extra strain on the supply chain. As supply problems persist, scalpers are reselling the consoles on websites such as eBay for 50 to 100% above their retail price. Nintendo made 20% fewer Switch consoles. The company originally planned to produce as many as 30 million units, but was only able to produce 24 million through their fiscal year, which was until March 2022.

Credit cards

Modern credit cards have EMV chips used for contactless payments. The shortage caused the typical replacement time for a credit card in the U.S. to increase from ten business days to six to eight weeks.

Reactions

Governments
On February 24, 2021, U.S. President Joe Biden signed an executive order trying to address the chip shortage by reviewing options to strengthen the semiconductor supply chain. Later in April, CEOs of major technology companies and U.S. government officials attended a virtual summit with the White House to talk about improving the resilience of the semiconductor supply chain. In a virtual meeting on September 23, 2021, which followed another meeting in May, the White House pressed automakers, chip manufacturers and others to provide information on the ongoing crisis that has forced cuts to U.S. automobile production, and to take the lead in helping solve it.

On September 15, 2021, President of the European Commission Ursula von der Leyen trailed a forthcoming European Chips Act in her State of the Union address. It was announced that the European Union will use legislation to push for greater resilience and sovereignty in regional semiconductor supply chains.

In December 2021, India outlined a plan to boost its chip manufacturing base.

US Congress passed the CHIPS Act in summer 2022 and on August 9, 2022 President Biden signed the bill into law.

In January 2023, the U.S., Japan, and the Netherlands reached an agreement to limit certain advanced chip exports to China.

Companies
On July 22, 2021, Intel CEO Pat Gelsinger said he expects the chip shortage will get worse in the second half of 2021 and that it will be a year or two before supplies return to normal. On August 19, 2021, Jensen Huang, CEO of Nvidia, said he expects the shortage to continue well into 2022, while AMD CEO Lisa Su said on September 27, 2021, that the shortage would improve throughout the second half of 2022, though she warned that supply would remain tight until then. However, IBM CEO Arvind Krishna said on October 11 that any prediction of a resolution to the chip shortage by the end of 2022 is optimistic, and that he sees it "more likely" that the issue will not be fully solved until 2023 or 2024.

On September 24, 2021, Taiwan's TSMC said it is actively supporting and working with all stakeholders to overcome the global chip crisis, after its participation at the White House virtual meeting on September 23. Earlier in April 2021, TSMC announced that it plans to invest US$100 billion over the next three years to increase capacity at its plants, days after Intel announced a US$20 billion plan to expand its advanced chip making capacity in Arizona. Already in May 2020, TSMC announced its US$12 billion plan to build and operate a semiconductor fab in Arizona, their second manufacturing site in the United States. Construction is underway as of June 2021, with chip production targeted to begin in 2024. In December 2022, TSMC announced it would triple its investment in its Arizona plants to a total of $40billion.

On September 20, 2021, the CEO of U.S. automaker General Motors, Mary Barra, said that the chip shortage has forced a supply chain rethink. Barra said that the company will source more semiconductors directly from chip manufacturers instead of suppliers to adapt to the ongoing global chip shortage.

ASML Holding, the largest supplier for the semiconductor industry and the sole supplier of extreme ultraviolet lithography photolithography machines to produce the most advanced computer chips, has been profiting from the chip shortage.

On November 9, 2021, TSMC announced a partnership deal with Sony (Sony Semiconductor Solutions Corporation) for a new $7 billion chip factory in Kumamoto, Japan. The plant will produce 22-nanometer and 28-nanometer chips to address strong global demand for specialty chip technologies. The factory began construction in 2022 and is expected to be operational by 2024.

On November 29, 2021, Nissan CEO, Makoto Uchida, told the BBC it was too early to say when normal deliveries of microchips, and therefore finished cars, would resume.

References

2020 in computing
2020s economic history
2021 in computing
2022 in computing
2023 in computing
Chip shortage
Economic impact of the COVID-19 pandemic
Impact of the COVID-19 pandemic on science and technology